Shani Shingnapur or Shani Shinganapur  or Shingnapur is a village in the Indian state of Maharashtra. Situated in Nevasa taluka in Ahmednagar district, the village is known for its popular temple of Shani, the Hindu god associated with the planet (graha) Saturn. Shingnapur is 35km from Ahmednagar city. Shani Shingnapur Devsthan Trust ,Shani Shingnapur is registered under Mumbai Public Trust act.

Details
Shingnapur is also famous for the fact that no house in the village has doors, only door frames. Despite this, officially no theft was reported in the village although there were reports of theft in 2010 and 2011.

The temple is believed to be a "jagrut devasthan" (lit. "alive temple"), meaning that a deity still resides in the temple icon. Villagers believe that god Shani punishes anyone attempting theft. The deity here is "Swayambhu" (Sanskrit: self-evolved deity) that is self emerged from earth in form of black, imposing stone. Though no one knows the exact period, it is believed that the Swayambhu Shanaishwara statue was found by shepherds of the then local hamlet. It is believed to be in existence at least since the start of Kali Yuga.

The village has a post office and a high school known as Shri Shanishwar Vidya Mandir besides the primary schools run by the Zilla Parishad. The chief source of water supply in the village is wells.

Historical importance

The story of the swayambhu statue handed down from generations through word of mouth, goes something like this: When the Shepherd touched the stone with a pointed rod, the stone started bleeding. The shepherds were astounded. Soon the whole village gathered around to watch the miracle. On that night Lord Shaneeshwara appeared in the dream of the most devoted and pious of the 

He told the shepherd that he is "Shaneeshwara". He also told that the unique looking black stone is his swayambhu form. The shepherd prayed and asked the lord whether he should construct a temple for him. To this, Lord Shani Mahatma said there is no need for a roof as the whole sky is his roof and he preferred to be under open sky. He asked the shepherd to do daily pooja and 'Tailabhisheka' every Saturday without fail. He also promised the whole hamlet will have no fear of dacoits or burglars or thieves.

So, Lord Shanaishwara can be seen even today, in the open yard without any roof above. To this day, there are no doors for any houses, shops, temples. It is to be seen to believe that even post office has no door, not to speak of locks. Due to the fear of Lord Shani, none of the structures, be it dwelling houses, huts, shops, etc. situated within one kilometer radius of this Lord Shani temple have neither doors nor locks. No thievery or burglary was reported until 2010 when first theft was reported and again another one was reported in 2011. This Shani Shingnapur is visited daily by thousands of devotees praying for Lord Shaneswara's favour. The place is busiest on Saturdays. Shani Thrayodashi is considered to be a favorite day for the lord. Similarly Saturday falling on 'Amavasya'(new moon day in Sanskrit and many other Indian languages) is considered to be a favourite day for the Lord Shanaishwara and on that days devotees seeking his blessings throng this temple in thousands. In the many years history of the village, there has not been a single incident of theft, riots, murder or rape. It is believed that nobody from the village has ever gone to a home of the aged, nor has there been a single complaint lodged in a police station.

Shrine of Shani
The shrine for Shani consists of a five and a half feet high black rock installed on an open-air platform, which symbolizes the god Shani. A Trishula (trident) is placed along the side of the image and a Nandi (bull) image is on the south side. In front are the small images of Shiva and Hanuman.

Generally, the temple has 30–45,000 visitors a day, which swells to around three lakh (i.e. three hundred thousand) on amavasya (the no moon day), believed to be the most auspicious day to appease Shani. The village holds a fair in honour of the deity on this day. A bigger festival is held on new moon days that fall on Saturdays. Devotees bathe Lord Shani's image with water and oil and offer flowers, and udid to him. A palanquin procession of Shani is held on the day of the fair.  Other festivals include the birthday of Shani, Shani Jayanti.

The shrine gained popularity with the decade-old film Surya Putra Shanidev made by the film producer Gulshan Kumar.

Entry to women

According to a 400-year tradition, women are restricted from entering the inner sanctum. On 26 January 2016, a group of over 500 women, led by activist Trupti Desai, marched to the temple under the group "Bhumata Ranragani Brigade", demanding entry into the Inner sanctum. They were stopped by the police.

In a landmark judgement on 30 March 2016, the Bombay High Court asked Maharashtra government to ensure that women are not denied entry to any temple. On 8 April 2016, the Shani Shingnapur trust finally allowed the women devotees to enter the sanctum.

UCO Bank
In January 2011, the United Commercial (UCO) Bank opened a 'lockless' branch in the village, the first of its kind in the country, taking note of the near-zero crime rate in the region. The local police were reported to be unhappy over this development and that it amounted to a breach of conditions, because the Central government of India has made it mandatory for all banks to have high security. The bank has doors, but they will always remain open. However, it was reported by the local legislator and the bank officials that adequate precautions were being taken for the safety of lockers and important documents.

Bull carting 

The way to Shingnapur village is covered with sugarcane fields and local people use bull to extract juice from the sugarcane, instead of machines and this type of juice extraction centres are known as Rasavanti.

References

External links
 Official site of the temple
 Interesting facts About Shani Shingnapur Temple
 Shani Shingnapur Information
 Ahmednagar District page about the temple
  facts About Shani Shingnapur Temple

Hindu temples in Maharashtra
Navagraha
Villages in Ahmednagar district
Shani temples